James B. Reynolds (1779June 10, 1851) was an American politician that represented Tennessee in the United States House of Representatives.

Biography
Reynolds was born in County Antrim in the Kingdom of Ireland in 1779. He attended the common schools and immigrated to the United States in 1798. In 1804 he settled in Clarksville, Tennessee and studied law. He was admitted to bar the same year.

Career
Reynolds was elected as a Democratic-Republican to the Fourteenth Congress, which lasted from March 4, 1815 to March 3, 1817. He was also elected to the Eighteenth Congress, which lasted from March 4, 1823 to March 3, 1825.  He resumed the practice of law after each office. In 1835, Reynolds was a shareholder when The Branch Bank of Planters Bank, headquartered in Nashville, opened in Clarksville, Tennessee.

Death
Reynolds died in Clarksville on June 10, 1851 at about age 71 years. He is interred at the Riverside Cemetery in Clarksville, Tennessee,  alongside family members Joseph Reynolds and Bridget McCue.

References

External links 

 

BANKS  In 1859, Montgomery County Historical Society

1779 births
1851 deaths
Irish emigrants to the United States (before 1923)
Democratic-Republican Party members of the United States House of Representatives from Tennessee